Ivan (Vazha) Zarandia was Chairman of the Soviet of Ministers of Abkhazia from May 1992 to December 1993.

Early life
Zarandia was born on 1 November 1932 in the village of Uakum, where he also went to school and worked on the state farm from 1951 until 1954. From 1955 until 1959, Zarandia studied in the History and Philology Faculty of the Sukhumi State Pedagogical Institute. From September 1960 until March 1961 he taught history at the school in Uakum.

Political career in the Soviet Union

From March 1961 until January 1965, Zarandia was Secretary of the Komsomol Committee of the Georgian Institute for Subtropical Agriculture in Sukhumi, and then until November 1967, Chairman of its United Trade Union Committee. From November 1967 until August 1971, he was instructor with the Abkhazian Obkom of the Communist Party, and then until January 1974, Department Head. Between January and November 1974, Zarandia was both Head of the Agriculture Department of the Abkhazian gorkom of the Communist Party, and Chairman of the Sukhumi District Executive Committee. From November 1974 until December 1991, he was the head of the State Procurement Inspectorate for the Abkhazian ASSR of the Union Ministry for Procurement.

Post-Soviet political career
On 5 May 1992, Zarandia was elected Chairman of the Soviet of Ministers of Abkhazia, defeating Interior Minister Givi Lominadze. He held the position until 12 December 1993, but during the 1992-1993 war with Georgia, his tasks were in practice taken over by Leonid Lakerbaia. From December 1993 until April 1994, Zarandia was Governor of the Gali District.

In 2002, Zarandia was elected to the People's Assembly, becoming the oldest member of its 3rd convocation. In 2007, he failed to be re-elected in his constituency (no. 32, Uakum), losing to Omar Kvarchia.

References

1932 births
Living people
People from Tkvarcheli District
Prime Ministers of Abkhazia
3rd convocation of the People's Assembly of Abkhazia
Heads of Gali District